Kerutuk daging or daging masak kerutuk is a traditional food in Kelantan, Malaysia.

The main ingredient used to prepare this dish is beef (Malay: daging). Kerutuk daging is a very rich type of coconut milk-based curry. Traditionally it is best eaten with white rice, sambal belacan and ulam-ulaman or Malay salad.

See also

 Cuisine of Malaysia

References

External links
 Kerutuk daging
Kerutuk Daging | How To Cook Malaysian Black Beef Curry - Delicious Traditional Kelantanese Cuisine

Malay cuisine